Fluorenol, also known as hydrafinil, is an alcohol derivative of fluorene. In the most significant isomer, fluoren-9-ol or 9-hydroxyfluorene, the hydroxy group is located on the bridging carbon between the two benzene rings. Hydroxyfluorene can be converted to fluorenone by oxidation. It is a white-cream colored solid at room temperature.

Toxicity
Fluorenol is toxic to aquatic organisms including algae, bacteria, and crustaceans.  Fluorenol was patented as an insecticide in 1939, and is an algaecide against the green algae Dunaliella bioculata.

Its toxicity and carcinogenicity in humans are unknown.

Mechanism of action 
The exact mechanism of action of fluorenol is unknown.

The lipophilicity of fluorenol (LogP 2.4) is higher than that of drugs like modafinil (LogP 1.7) and amphetamine (LogP 1.8), suggesting that it may penetrate the blood brain barrier more readily.

Eugeroic
A study published by Cephalon describing research to develop a successor to the eugeroic modafinil reported that the corresponding fluorenol derivative was 39% more effective than modafinil at keeping mice awake over a 4-hour period. However, after further investigation it was determined that the eugeroic activity of the fluorenol analog was likely due to an active metabolite, which they identify as fluorenol itself.  Fluorenol is a weak dopamine reuptake inhibitor with an IC50 of 9 μM, notably 59% weaker than modafinil (IC50 = 3.70 μM), potentially making it even less liable for addiction. It also showed no affinity for cytochrome P450 2C19, unlike modafinil.

There is no evidence (binding assays, occupancy, predicted structure) to suggest that fluorenol acts as a 5-HT6 antagonist, contrary to some popular claims.

Sale as research chemical 
The unscheduled nature of fluorenol has caused it to fall into a legal grey area in most countries. Despite being associated with modafinil, fluorenol does not bear any chemical resemblance to it, making its scheduling unimplied by analogue acts.

Fluorenol is a relatively obscure compound in the research chemical market. According to an online survey with over 3000 respondents, only 2% of modafinil users have reported using fluorenol.

See also
 Adrafinil
 Armodafinil
 CRL-40,940
 CRL-40,941
 Fluorenone

References

Designer drugs
Fluorenes
Secondary alcohols
Dopamine reuptake inhibitors
Biocides
Algaecides
Insecticides
Drugs with unknown mechanisms of action